California's 2012 wildfire season saw 7,950 wildfires burn a total of ; these included the massive Rush Fire, which was the tenth-largest wildfire recorded in California in modern times, and the Ponderosa Fire, which destroyed 133 structures. The California Department of Forestry and Fire Protection (Cal Fire) incurred fire suppression costs of US$310 million between July 2012 and June 2013, in addition to wildfire damages of $28.2 million.

Fires 
The following is a list of the wildfires that burned more than 1,000 acres (400 hectares), produced significant structural damage or casualties, or were otherwise notable. It is excerpted from Cal Fire's 2012 list of large (≥300 acres) fires, and may not be complete or reflect the most recent information.

References

 
California, 2012
Wildfires in California by year